Émile Aubin (1866–1949) was a French anarcho-syndicalist.

References 

 

1886 births
1949 deaths
French anarchists
French syndicalists